Afrah Gomdi is a Paralympian athlete from Tunisia competing mainly in category F40 throwing events.

Afrah competed in the 2004 Summer Paralympics in Athens where she won gold medals in both the F40 javelin and shot put and picked up the silver in the F40 discus.

References

External links
 profile on paralympic.org

Paralympic athletes of Tunisia
Athletes (track and field) at the 2004 Summer Paralympics
Paralympic gold medalists for Tunisia
Paralympic silver medalists for Tunisia
Living people
Year of birth missing (living people)
Medalists at the 2004 Summer Paralympics
Tunisian female javelin throwers
Tunisian female shot putters
Tunisian female discus throwers
Paralympic medalists in athletics (track and field)
20th-century Tunisian women
21st-century Tunisian women